is a Japanese professional wrestler, currently working for the Japanese professional wrestling promotion DDT Pro-Wrestling (DDT).

Professional wrestling career

Independent circuit (2017-present)
Naya made his professional wrestling debut for Real Japan Pro Wrestling, at RJPW Legend Of The Gold VIII on September 14, 2017, scoring a victory against Ichiro Yaguchi. At RJPW Dynamite Kid Memorial Performance an event celebrating the life of Dynamite Kid which took place on March 15, 2019, Naya teamed up with Yuji Okabayashi and Alexander Otsuka to defeat Hideki Suzuki, Hideyoshi Kamitani and Ryoji Sai in a six-man tag team match. While competing for Wrestle-1, he participated in the WRESTLE-1 Tag League 2018, and on the second night of the WRESTLE-1 Tour Updraft from October 8, he teamed up with Masayuki Kono, falling short to Shuji Kondo and Koji Doi. At WRESTLE-1 Tour 2018 5th Anniversary on September 23, Naya teamed up with Masayuki Kono to defeat Ganseki Tanaka and Tsugutaka Sato in the same Tag League Tournament.

Dramatic Dream Team (DDT) (2019-present)
Naya made his first appearance for Dramatic Dream Team at Judgement 2019: DDT 22nd Anniversary on February 17, 2019, where he teamed up with Go Shiozaki, Kazusada Higuchi to defeat Daisuke Sekimoto, Toru Owashi and Yuki Iino. At Wrestle Peter Pan 2019 on July 15, he faced Hideki Suzuki in a losing effort. At DDT Handmade In Japan FES 2020 on January 11, 2020, he teamed up with Makoto Oishi and fell short to the winners Nautilus (Naomi Yoshimura and Yuki Ueno), All Out (Shunma Katsumata and Yuki Ino) and Keigo Nakamura and Mao in a four-way tag team match. Naya formed a brief team with Cody Hall, with whom he teamed up at DDT Valentine Itabashi Series 2020 on February 1, where they defeated Danshoku Dino and Hiroshi Yamato. At Into The Fight 2020 on February 23, he fell short to Mad Paulie and Keigo Nakamura in a three-way match. On the second night of Wrestle Peter Pan 2020 from June 7, Naya unsuccessfully challenged Shinya Aoki in a No Countout match for the DDT Extreme Division Championship. On the second night of King Of DDT 2020 Tournament, Naya participated in a 13-man battle royal for a chance to re-enter the tournament, where he competed against the winner Tetsuya Endo, Antonio Honda, Kazuki Hirata, Yukio Sakaguchi and others. He previously got defeated by El Lindaman on the first night. At DDT This Will Be Our Ninth Narimasu Event on Febauray 20, 2021, Naya teamed up with Chris Brookes and Toi Kojima in a losing effort to Gota Ihashi, Toru Owashi and Antonio Honda. At Into The Fight 2021 on February 28, Naya teamed up with Disasterbox (Harashima and Toru Owashi) to defeat Damnation (Daisuke Sasaki, Mad Paulie) and Nobuhiro Shimatani. Naya is a former Ironman Heavymetalweight Champion, title which he won alongside Mizuki Watase, Antonio Honda and Danshoku Dino at Judgement 2020: DDT 23rd Anniversary on March 20, 2020, after they simultaneously pinned Masahiro Takanashi to become co-champions. At Judgement 2021: DDT 24th Anniversary on March 28, he teamed up with Sanshiro Takagi, Chikara and Yakan Nabe to defeat Shinya Aoki, Super Sasadango Machine, Antonio Honda and Kazuki Hirata for the KO-D 8-Man Tag Team Championship.

Personal life
Naya is the son of the former sumo wrestler Takatōriki Tadashige and the grandson of Taihō Kōki.

Championships and accomplishments
DDT Pro-Wrestling
Ironman Heavymetalweight Championship (1 time) – with Antonio Honda, Danshoku Dino and Mizuki Watase
KO-D 8-Man Tag Team Championship (1 time) – with Sanshiro Takagi, Chikara and Yakan Nabe

References 

1994 births
Living people
Japanese male professional wrestlers
21st-century professional wrestlers
Ironman Heavymetalweight Champions
KO-D 8-Man/10-Man Tag Team Champions